Hydnellum gracilipes is a species of tooth fungus in the family Bankeraceae. It was first described scientifically in 1886 by Petter Karsten, who called it Hydnum gracilipes. He transferred it to the genus Hydnellum in 1879. Fruit bodies of the fungus have a pinkish to reddish-brown colour, a delicate texture described as "felty or papery", and flimsy stipes. Its spores are roughly spherical with a diameter of no more than 5 µm. H. gracilipes is found in northern Europe, where it is mycorrhizal with pine. Collections made in Scotland have been found by lifting the dense ground cover of common heather (Calluna vulgaris), which the fungus seems to use to as support to compensate for its flimsy stipe.

See also
List of fungi by conservation status

References

Fungi described in 1866
Fungi of Europe
gracilipes